is an anime series produced by Nippon Animation.

The story is loosely based on the 1812 novel Swiss Family Robinson by Swiss author Johann David Wyss. As such it exhibits the same geographically impossible array flora and fauna.

Outline 
The character of Flone is not present in the original novel, in which the family consists of only a father, a mother, and four sons (no daughters). Flone was likely introduced by Nippon Animation as a new character for the anime version to attract more girls as viewers. Also in the anime version, the oldest of the Robinson children, Fritz, is named "Franz" (though his name is changed back to Fritz in the English dub), and the character of Jack is a three-year-old rather than a ten-year-old. The name of the second child Ernst, here is switched to the father, William in the novel, while the mother Elizabeth is renamed Anna (in the sequel The Castaways of the Flag, Ernst eventually marries a girl named Annah). Like in many other adaptation, Robinson becomes the actual surname of the family. In addition, the new characters of Captain Morton and TamTam were made-up to help the family leaving the island, while Emily is probably inspired by the young English castaway Jenny Montrose. In this adaptation, all the members of the family leave the island. Furthermore, the setting is postdated from the early 1800s to 1880s. This is deducible not only from the clothing but also from the presence of the Sydney–Melbourne rail corridor, inaugurated in 1883.

Very popular in Europe, this anime is one of the few World Masterpiece Theater series to have been dubbed into the English language for the American market. An English dub by PMT, Ltd, titled simply Swiss Family Robinson, aired on The Family Channel cable network in the U.S. in 1989. This dub renames Flone "Becca" as well as her older brother Franz "Fritz". It can currently be seen on the Smile of a Child network and Amazon Prime video. In addition, an Arabic dub was made for the Arab World which can also be seen on NETFLIX named “The Swiss Family Robinson”.

Plot
The Robinson family consists of the patriarch Ernest Robinson, a doctor by profession, Anna Robinson, the matriarch who is a housewife grew up and belong to a farmer family, the oldest son Franz who aspires to be a musician, the middle child Flone, a tomboy, and the youngest son, Jack. The family receive a letter from Dr Robinson's English friend in Australia, Dr Elliot, who wishes for Dr Robinson to treat people in Australia due to the lack of doctors. This is an issue for the children, as the family will be permanently settled in Australia. Franz disagrees since he realizes there is no way he would be able to study music in Australia due to lack of appropriate music institutes. Flone is initially excited since she wants to play with kangaroos, however soon she realises their family maid Marie would not be able to make it since she is taking care of her ill auntie. As a compromise, the family decide to have their relatives over, to take care of Franz while the rest of the family move to Australia. On the day of the voyage, though, Franz changes his mind at the last moment and jumps onto the ship.

At the Blackburn Rock ship, Franz met a girl named Emily who he befriends. The rest of the family interact with various people on the ship, such as the time when Dr Robinson has to assist a pregnant woman give birth. One night, on the day of Christmas presentation, a storm rages on the ship for five days. Dr Robinson and his family are not able to make it into the lifeboat as they were busy trying to tend to the injured. The captain ties Franz onto a log of wood which saves him from drowning, and the rest of the family prepare a makeshift raft to make their way into an uninhabited island before the ship sank. They arrive at an uninhabited island, (in 155°East Longitude and 10° South Latitude based on estimation of Mr. Morton) where they found the body of the ship captain of Blackburn Rock on the shore. On the captain's burial, they found the Blackburn Rock ship sinking with animals within.

They set up camp at the shore of the beach but are soon forced to relocate and make a house on a treetop due to the presence of jackals/striped wolves. They have John the dog who was the pet of the captain, and they befriend a petit baby cuscus and they name it Mercer. They also rescue some chickens and donkey from the ship and goats living solitarily at the island. Dr Robinson and Franz spend most of the day exploring and doing carpentry work, while Anna prepares food and does farming. One time, they saw a ship coming and try to fire a rifle to signal it, but they fail to catch its attention. They spend their days mostly surviving and building boats/ships and doing household chores and for the children, studying. Once heavy rain and wind set, they set out to find a water-proof home, and they come across a cave. They found a skeleton in the cave with a diary near it, as they read they realise the man, whose name was Eric Bates, never made it off the island and died, presumably from malaria. They give him a proper burial. As Flone explores the cave and fetching water, she sees a silhouette of a boy running but the family assume that it is a wild animal although they, especially Flone have a hunch that there are other people living in the island. The next day, Flone finds a boy stealing melon from their garden. The boy, whose name is TomTom, an orphan Australian Aborigine who survives in the sunken boat. They find that he lives with an injured ship captain, Mr Morton. Anna is initially repelled by him due to his rude nature and after he tried to get Jack to smoke an improvised leave cigarette, but soon warms up to him after she read a letter founded by Ernest on the canoe requesting for possible ship to rescue the Robinson family and after realising he had good intentions at heart. Like Ana, Franz  as well does not like Mr. Morton. TomTom initially refuses to interact with the Robinson family as his family was subjected to slavery at the hands of Europeans but warms up to Flone and the rest of the family soon. One day, Tamtam with Mr. Morton went to the treehouse with the ostrich that they caught, Mr. Morton slapped the ostrich to run so that Robinsons siblings will be able to leave the house to catch the running ostrich. While Franz, Flone, Jack and Tamtam are chasing the ostrich. Mr. Morton climbed the tree and enter the treehouse and stole a rifle, magnifying lens and some of Robinson's family accessories. That night, He left Tamtam without a word sleeping on the cave. The next day, Tamtam went on the Robinson family to see if Mr. Morton was with them, The whole day, He spent each hour on the shore hoping Mr. Morton will return. That night, while Robinson family is sleeping, Tamtam left the Robinsons and return to cave and Ana notice that Tamtam gone that morning. Flone while looking for Tamtam entered to the cave and notice that the underground water was warm. While Tamtam was with Robinson's family, the animals on the island began to behave strange. That night, while the Robinson family is sleeping, an earthquake occur twice.  On his return at the island, Mr Morton asks the family to build another ship as soon as possible, to leave and find their way to Australia after they find out the island is actually a volcanic island which may erupt soon, further there were frequent earthquakes. After staying on the island for over a year, they finally leave to Australia on the boat they built with. The voyage takes much longer than expected but they finally make it, barely alive. They landed at the north of Sydney in winter and travelled by train to Melbourne. The family is greeted by Dr Elliot who provides them with a nice house to stay in, while TomTom stays with the Robinsons until Mr Morton finds another ship. They find out that Emily made it alive and was training to be a nurse, hence after a short reunion, she decides to leave for England to study medicine and become a nurse for three years. It happens to be the same ship Mr Morton and TomTom were sailing in. The Robinson family say their goodbyes and the anime ends.

Episodes
First in the series original Japanese episode titles followed by the original English translation and English dub (PMT, Ltd,) episode titles
In the English dub, episodes 7 and 8 have been merged into one.

Characters
  Flone Robinson (Rebecca/Becca in the American English dub): The main protagonist and middle daughter of the Robinson family. Flone is free-spirited and willing to do almost anything. She always speaks her mind and enjoys doing new things. The story is usually told from her point of view. Her family celebrates her 11th birthday on the island on September 13. She is voiced by Reba West in the English Dub, and by Yoshiko Matsuo in Japanese.
  Franz Robinson (Fritz in the American English dub): The oldest of Flone and her brothers, being fifteen and in high school. In sharp contrast to his outgoing sister, He's extremely introverted and shy. He longs to be a music composer and sets out to accomplish that dream. Because of these facts, Fritz is anything but athletic, spending all of his time after school, in his room, playing his flute and guitar or writing music. Fritz appears to have few, if any friends, at the start of the series. He becomes a more outgoing person, after he meets Emily on the ship and falls in love with her. He also becomes stronger, once the Robinson's become stranded on the island, helping his father with various building projects. On his birthday, Fritz and his siblings catch an ostrich, with help from Tom-Tom. He is voiced by R. Dwight in the English dub and by Tōru Furuya in Japanese.
 Dr. Ernest Robinson: Dr Ernest Robinson is the 46-year-old father of Flone and head of the Robinson family. He is a wealthy medical doctor who helps poor people who can't afford medical assistance. He decides to take his family to Australia after receiving a letter, leaving behind the home of his father, grandfather, and great-grandfather. He is voiced by Jeremy Platt in the English dub and by Katsuhiko Kobayashi in the first part of the series and later by Osamu Kobayashi in Japanese in the second part of the series.
 Anna Robinson: Anna is Flone's mother, and easily frightened by small rodents, reptiles, as well as other things. She is the typical housewife, tending to the home and children, as well as frowning upon the carefree ways of her free-spirited daughter, Flone, as well as the smoking habit of Captain Morton. She accompanies her husband on the trip to Australia saying she'll always stand by his decision. Her family celebrates her 37th birthday on the island. She is voiced by Wendee Swann in the English dub, and by Michiko Hirai in Japanese.
 Jack Robinson: The youngest son. Unlike his mother, he seems to take after Flone and not be afraid of anything. He always gets into the troublesome way and loves to collect things from seashells to small animals and reptiles. He is three years old and has a feminine voice. He is voiced by Grace Michaels in the English dub and by Makoto Kousaka in Japanese.
 John/Brewster: A Saint Bernard who once belong to a Captain of the Ship which drowned in the Typhoon which shipwrecked the Robinsons that becomes the family pet and Guard Dog. Jack was afraid of him at first because of how big he was, but Jack eventually became good friends with him.
 Mercedes/Meri Chri: A bear cuscus or phalanger (a type of marsupial native to the Australasian realm) that becomes a family pet. Becca (Flone) and Jack spend much time playing with her. She is also friends with Brewster.
Donkey/Robert: A donkey who survived the shipwreck and became a useful member of the Robinsons and a Pack Animal for carrying wood and sugar cane to the Robinsons compound. The donkey later died of stress-related issues and possibly old age after helping the Robinsons, Captain Morton and Tam Tam hauling the Catamaran into the ocean.
 Eric and Bates: A mother and a baby goat that the family found on the island, named after Eric Bates, a man who stranded several years before the events of the series and died there. His skeleton and diary were later discovered by the Robinsons.
 Captain Morton: A grumpy, hard-drinking, cigar-smoking Sea Captain who the Robinsons discover living in a cave. Anna disapproves of his smoking habit and dislikes him strongly at first, especially after he tries to get Jack to smoke a cigar, but gradually warms to him. He is voiced by Michael Sorich in the English dub and by Ichirō Nagai in Japanese.
 Tam Tam (TomTom in the American English Dub): A young Australian Aborigine boy about age 9 to 10 years old who is the companion of Morton and becomes good friends with Flone/Becca, Franz/Fritz, and Jack. He is voiced by Tom Wyner in the English dub and by Yoku Shioya in Japanese.
 Emily: A young woman who becomes friends with the Robinsons before being separated during the Typhoon. She is voiced by Kaoru Kurosu in Japanese.
 Marie: The Robinson family's live-in servant, who decides not to accompany the family from Switzerland to Australia.  She is voiced by Ellyn Stern Epcar in the English dub and by Satomi Majima in Japanese.
Elliott: voiced in Japanese  by Tamio Oki.
Emily's Father: voiced in Japanese by Kan Tokumaru.
Emily's Mother: voiced in Japanese by Yoshiko Asai.
Emily's Grandmother: voiced by Mona Marshall in the English dub and by Atsuko Mine in Japanese.
Gerhardt: voiced in Japanese by Kõichi Kitamura.
Haizecupp: voiced in Japanese by Keiko Hanagata.
 Dr Samuel Elliot: A friend of Dr Ernest Robinson who lives in Australia. Voiced by Richard Epcar in the English dub.
 The Captain: The Commander of the Blackburn Rock who once took the passengers on a voyage from England to Australia, and died from drowning after shipwrecked and saved Franz/Fritz, whom he fell overboard with him, from drowning. Voiced by Bob Papenbrook in English dub.
 The Doctor: The Blackburn Rock's doctor who uses to be drunken. Voiced by Bob Papenbrook in English dub.

International Titles
A Família Robinson (Portuguese Title)
Die schweizer Familie Robinson (German Title)
Familie Robinson (Dutch Title)
Flo et les Robinson Suisses (French Title)
Flo, la piccola Robinson (Italian Title)
Flone of the Marvelous Island (English Title)
Flone on the Marvelous Island (English Title)
Kazoku Robinson Hyōryūki - Fushigina Shima no Flone (Japanese Title)
L'isola della piccola Flo (Italian Title)
La familia de los robinsones suizos (Spanish Title)
La familia Robinsón (Spanish Title)
La familia Robinson suiza (Spanish Title)
Las Aventuras de la Familia Robinson Suiza (Spanish Title)
Los Robinsones de los Mares del Sur (Spanish Title)
Robinson Family Lost at Sea - Flone of the Marvelous Island (English Title)
The Adventures of Swiss Family Robinson (English Title)
The Swiss Family Robinson: Flone of The Mysterious Island (English Title)
Флона на чудесном острове (Russian Title)
 (Persian Title)
 (Arabic Title)
ふしぎな島のフローネ (Japanese Title)
家族ロビンソン漂流記 ふしぎな島のフローネ (Japanese Title)
新魯賓遜漂流記 (Chinese Title)
플로네의 모험 (Korean Title)

Music
 Opening theme:  by Keiko Han.
 Ending theme:  by Keiko Han.
 Boshi No Kumoriuta (used at Episode 31)
 English opening theme: Swiss Family Robinson by Ron Krueger.

References

External links

1981 anime television series debuts
Japanese children's animated adventure television series
Adventure anime and manga
Period family drama television series
The Swiss Family Robinson
The Family Channel (American TV network, founded 1990) original programming
Television shows based on Swiss novels
Television shows based on children's books
Animated television series about children
Animated television series about siblings
Animated television series about families
Television shows set on islands
World Masterpiece Theater series
 
Television shows set in Australia